Florencia Bécquer (1910–1994) was an Argentine-born Spanish film actress.

Filmography

1925: Corazón, o La vida de una modista
1926: Luis Candelas o El bandido de Madrid
1927: Malvaloca
1927: Sister San Sulpicio
1928: El médico a palos
1928: ¡Viva Madrid, que es mi pueblo!
1929: El gordo de navidad
1929: 48 pesetas de taxi
1933: Sobre el cieno
1940: Jai-Alai
1941: Oro vil
1942: Fortunato
1942: La aldea maldita
1943: Un caballero famoso
1944: Una herencia de París
1948: Charro a la fuerza

References

Bibliography 
 Bentley, Bernard. A Companion to Spanish Cinema. Boydell & Brewer 2008.

External links 
 

1910 births
1994 deaths
Spanish film actresses
Spanish silent film actresses
Argentine film actresses
Argentine silent film actresses
Argentine people of German descent
Argentine emigrants to Spain
People from Resistencia, Chaco